Don José Antonio de Gaztañeta e Iturribalzaga (alternatively José Antonio de Castaneta; 1656 – 1728) was a Spanish Basque ship-builder and sailor best remembered as the Vice-Admiral who commanded the Spanish Mediterranean fleet at the Battle of Cape Passaro against Great Britain on August 11, 1718, off the coast of Sicily. Gaztañeta's fleet was decisively defeated.

Biography  
De Gaztañeta was born in Mutriku, Gipuzkoa.

De Gaztañeta rose to the position of vice admiral but his most important contribution was in the field of ship building during the renovation and re-organisation of the Spanish Navy following its poor performance in the War of the Quadruple Alliance. He was an innovator who applied a scientific approach to ship design. He was at the origin of the revival of the Spanish Navy in the eighteenth century.

Son of Francisco de Gaztañeta, a Basque sailor to the Americas, he accompanied his father from the age of 12. In 1684, at the age of 28, he had already sailed 11 times to the Americas and back. In that year he joined the Spanish Navy. In 1691 he was posted in Cadiz and was involved in several campaigns of the War of the Grand Alliance against France. He saved a fleet coming back from Naples, cleverly avoiding an ambush by Admiral Tourville near Mahon.

During the War of Spanish Succession (1701–1714), he wasn't involved in warfare, but in ship building. He founded the shipyard of El Astillero. Later he went to the Basque Country and led the construction of many ships in Amorebieta, Pasajes and Orio.

In the War of the Quadruple Alliance (1718-1720) he was appointed head of the fleet which was to sail the Spanish Army under the Marquis of Lede to Sardinia and Sicily. After this was accomplished he positioned his fleet at Cape Passaro. The Spanish fleet was sailing in a scattered formation when it caught sight of the approaching British fleet and this led to a disastrous defeat in the Battle of Cape Passaro for the Spanish. Francisco de Gaztañeta's ship was captured, suffering 200 killed. Gaztañeta was injured in his foot and was made a prisoner of the British. He was released very soon and wasn't blamed for the defeat on his return to Spain.

He was promoted to Lieutenant General in 1720 and was made head of the Spanish treasure fleet. During the Anglo-Spanish War (1727) he guided the fleet through the British blockade of Puerto Bello, consisting of the fleets of Admirals Hosier and Wager. On his safe arrival in Spain King Philip V of Spain awarded him with a great deal of money, but shortly after, Gaztañeta died suddenly on February 5, 1728, in Madrid.

Gaztañeta married twice.

Cosme Damián de Churruca y Elorza is a relative.

Works 
 Arte de fabricar reales.
 Norte de la navegación hallado por el cuadrante de reducción. (1696)
 Cuadrante geométrico universal para la conversión esférica a los planos, aplicado al arte de navegar. (1697)
 Proporción de las medidas arregladas a la construcción de un bajel de guerra de setenta codos de quilla. (1712)
 Proporciones de las medidas más esenciales para la fábrica de nuevos navíos y fragatas de guerra. (1720)

References

Well-known people from Mutriku

Basque sailors
Spanish admirals
1656 births
1728 deaths
People from Debabarrena
17th-century Spanish people
18th-century Spanish people
Shipbuilders